is a Japanese amateur astronomer who discovered a number of comets.

As a young adult, Ikeya lived near Lake Hamana and worked for a piano factory. During his employment there, he made his first discovery in 1963 with an optical telescope he built himself within his low budget. Two years later, he discovered the bright comet C/1965 S1 (Ikeya-Seki).  Ikeya discovered  the periodic comet 153P/Ikeya-Zhang on February 1, 2002 in Mori, Hokkaidō. The asteroid 4037 Ikeya is also named after Ikeya.  On November 13, 2010, Ikeya discovered the P/2010 V1 (Ikeya-Murakami) comet using an optical telescope, rare in an era with access to digital imaging technology.

Ikeya contributed his skill to the perfectly ground optics used in the construction of the Pentax 40cm Cassegrain reflector telescope installed at the Singapore Science Centre Observatory in March, 1989.

References 

Discoverers of comets
20th-century Japanese astronomers
Living people
1943 births
21st-century Japanese astronomers